The Guam River is a river in northern Papua New Guinea.

See also
List of rivers of Papua New Guinea
Guam River languages
Moam River

References

Rivers of Papua New Guinea